Mystery Monsters is a 1997 film directed by Charles Band and starring Ashley Cafagna-Tesoro and Tim Redwine.

Plot
Tommy has just joined the cast of the top-rated kids' show, "Captain Mike's Mystery Monsters," and is anxious to find out just how the special effects crew gets the monsters to work. Imagine his surprise when he discovers they're not special effects at all! Complicating the situation, the monsters' previous owner, evil Queen Mara, has returned to Earth to reclaim her property and take revenge on Captain Mike for stealing them.

DVD release
The film was released on DVD by Full Moon Features in April 2012 under the title of "Goobers!".

References

External links

1997 films
Films directed by Charles Band
American fantasy films
Puppet films
1990s English-language films
1990s American films